Opsaridium loveridgii is a species of ray-finned fish in the family Cyprinidae.
It is found only in Tanzania.
Its natural habitats are rivers and freshwater lakes.

References

Opsaridium
Fish described in 1922
Freshwater fish of Tanzania
Taxonomy articles created by Polbot